Tablet of Destinies is a fantasy novel by Traci Harding. It is the second installment of a trilogy known as The Celestial Triad. The story follows a 20th-century Australian woman who is transported to 5th century Wales in an attempt to change the future. Major themes within the book include time travel, martial arts, magic and psychic phenomenon.

Plot summary
The second book in The Celestial Triad takes Tory and Maelgwyn into the realms of the Devachan, the Fourth Dimension. They and their clan have had many peaceful years on the planet of Kila until Tory's new twin babies, only a few days after their birth, are switched with changelings ... the babies now exhibit all the characteristics of fairy folk and, as with all deva infants, are neither male nor female.

Tory seeks the counsel of the Tablet of Destinies and is told that the changelings are the first of the Devachan to venture into human existence, and that her twins are the first humans to choose to experience the world of the Devachan ... and all the babies are psychically linked. To reclaim their children, Tory and Maelgwyn must journey into the fourth dimension.

Characters in "Tablet of Destinies"
Tory Alexander - The heroine of the story, Tory is a twenty-something Australian woman who is adept at Tae Kwon Do and speaks fluent Brythonic. Tory is one of the Chosen.

Maelgwn of Gwynedd - Former King of Gwynedd, Maelgwn is known as 'the Dragon of the Isle' or simply 'the Dragon'.

Miles Thurlow - Miles is Maelgwn's 21st century incarnation.

Taliesin Pen Beirdd - Spiritual advisor to Maelgwn and the magician who brings Tory back through time. Taliesin is one of the Chosen.

Brian Alexander - Tory's brother. Brian is Brockwell's 21st century incarnation. Brian is one of the Chosen.

Naomi - Brian's wife, Naomi, is Katren's 21st century incarnation. Brian & Naomi have 1 son, Daniel Alexander.

Teo - Teo is Taliesin Pen Beirdd's 21st century incarnation.

Rhun of Gwynedd - Rhun, former King of Gwynedd, is the first-born child of Tory & Maelgwn.

Rhiannon Thurlow - Rhiannon is Tory & Maelgwn's first-born daughter, conceived from Maelgwn's 21st century incarnation, Miles. Rhiannon is Aella's 21st century reincarnation.

Ray Murdok - Prince Bryce's 21st century incarnation.

Floyd - Floyd is Sir Tiernan's 21st century incarnation.

Allusions and references

Allusions to actual history, geography and current science
Some of the settings and characters within the book refer to history and mythology.

Sources, references, external links, quotations
The Ancient Future Trilogy on Traci Harding's webpage

Australian fantasy novels
2001 novels
Novels set in Wales
Novels about time travel
Fiction set in the 5th century